The Florida Collegiate Summer League (FCSL) is a six-team wood bat collegiate summer baseball league located in the Central Florida region of the southeastern United States.  The league was founded in the fall of 2003 and began play in the summer of 2004. It is a 501(c)(3) non-profit organization whose mission is to "advance college players toward their futures in professional baseball." 360 players have been drafted in the first thirteen seasons including 33 in the 2016 MLB Draft. FCSL has had 16 alumni play in Major League Baseball, including New York Mets pitcher Jacob deGrom, Milwaukee Brewers catcher Jonathan Lucroy, Miami Marlins second baseman Dee Gordon, Colorado Rockies pitcher Mike McClendon, Milwaukee Brewers pitcher Jimmy Nelson, and San Francisco Giants pitcher Chris Heston. The FCSL is one of twelve leagues in the National Alliance of College Summer Baseball.

Teams

Timeline of Teams

Alumni (top-five round picks and notables)

(*) = Reached the Major Leagues

Champions

Award winners

Celebrity golf tournament
Every November, the Florida League hosts a celebrity golf tournament at Interlachen Country Club in Winter Park, FL. Money raised from the event helps fund the League throughout the year. The weekend-long event includes a hitting & pitching clinic for kids, a catered pairings dinner, a meet-and-greet with the celebrities, a silent auction and the round of golf. Celebrity appearances have been made by dozens of current and former MLB players including: Davey Johnson, Frank Viola, Hunter Pence, José Bautista, Ray Lankford, Gary Carter, Fred McGriff, Jeff Bagwell, B.J. Upton, Tim Wakefield, Zack Greinke, Andrew McCutchen, Tim Raines, Vince Coleman and many others.

High school invitational
In an effort to reach out to baseball players of all levels, the FCSL also hosts multiple spring break tournaments during the month of March. All games are held at Historic Sanford Memorial Stadium in Sanford, FL. These tournaments, known as the Florida High School Invitational, bring in teams from all over the United States. The 2013 tournament featured twenty-three teams from across the country. Notable prospects who have participated in the FHSI include Albert Almora (#6 overall pick, 2012, Chicago Cubs), Dante Bichette, Jr. (1st round pick, 2011, New York Yankees), Francisco Lindor (#8 overall pick, 2011, Cleveland Indians), Javier Baez (#9 overall pick, 2011, Chicago Cubs), Greg Bird (5th round, 2011, New York Yankees), Tomas Nido (8th round, 2012, New York Mets), Chris Okey (All-American), and Touki Toussaint (All-American).

References

External links
Official website

College baseball leagues in the United States
Baseball leagues in Florida
Summer baseball leagues
2003 establishments in Florida
Sports leagues established in 2003